Anges Ngapy (born 2 March 1963) is a former Congolese international football forward.

Career
Born in Kellé, Ngapy began playing youth football for local side CARA Brazzaville. In 1981, he joined the club's senior team, where he would win the national championship before leaving to become a professional in 1985.

He moved to Belgium and signed with R.F.C. Seraing. He would spend the rest of his playing career in Belgium, spending time with K.R.C. Genk, K. Berchem Sport, R. Charleroi S.C., R.U. Saint-Gilloise and Rochefort.

Ngapy made several appearances for the Congo national football team, including three FIFA World Cup qualifying matches, and he participated at the 1992 African Cup of Nations finals.

References

External links 

1963 births
Living people
Republic of the Congo footballers
Republic of the Congo expatriate footballers
Republic of the Congo international footballers
1992 African Cup of Nations players
K.R.C. Genk players
K. Berchem Sport players
R. Charleroi S.C. players
Royale Union Saint-Gilloise players
Belgian Pro League players
Expatriate footballers in Belgium
Association football forwards